Sanjay Waman Sawakare is a member of the 13th Maharashtra Legislative Assembly in India. He represents the Bhusawal Assembly Constituency. He belongs to the Bharatiya Janata Party.

References

Maharashtra MLAs 2014–2019
People from Bhusawal
Living people
Bharatiya Janata Party politicians from Maharashtra
Nationalist Congress Party politicians from Maharashtra
Maharashtra MLAs 2019–2024
1969 births